Jared Leto is an American entertainer with an extensive career in film, music, and television. He made his debut with minor roles in the television shows Camp Wilder (1992) and Almost Home (1993). He achieved recognition in 1994 for his role as Jordan Catalano in the teen drama television series My So-Called Life. The show was praised for its portrayal of adolescence and gained a cult following, despite being canceled after only one season. The same year, he made his television film debut starring alongside Alicia Silverstone in Cool and the Crazy. Leto's first film role was in the 1995 drama How to Make an American Quilt. He later co-starred with Christina Ricci in The Last of the High Kings (1996) and received a supporting role in Switchback (1997). In 1997, Leto starred in the biopic Prefontaine in which he played the role of Olympic hopeful Steve Prefontaine. His portrayal received positive reviews from critics and is often considered his breakthrough role. The following year, Leto starred together with Alicia Witt in the horror Urban Legend. He then acted alongside Sean Penn and Adrien Brody in the war film The Thin Red Line (1998). After supporting roles in Black and White and Girl, Interrupted, Leto portrayed Angel Face in Fight Club (1999), which has since become a cult film.

In 2000, Leto played Paul Allen in the psychological thriller American Psycho. The same year, he starred as heroin addict Harry Goldfarb in Requiem for a Dream, directed by Darren Aronofsky. His acting in the addiction drama received praise from film critics. During this period Leto focused increasingly on his band Thirty Seconds to Mars, returning to acting in 2002 in the David Fincher-directed thriller Panic Room, which was well-received both critically and commercially. Following the lead role in the independent film Highway (2002), he co-starred with Colin Farrell in the historical drama Alexander (2004) as Hephaestion. Leto then starred together with Nicolas Cage in the political crime thriller Lord of War (2005) and acted alongside Salma Hayek in the crime drama Lonely Hearts (2006) as Raymond Fernandez. He also began to direct music videos for Thirty Seconds to Mars, with the first being "The Kill" (2006). The following year, he portrayed Mark David Chapman in the biopic Chapter 27. Despite divided critical opinion on the film as a whole, Leto's performance was widely praised.

In 2009, he starred in the science fiction drama Mr. Nobody directed by Jaco Van Dormael. Critics praised the film's artistry and Leto's acting. He later directed the music videos for "Kings and Queens" (2009) and "Hurricane" (2010), which were both nominated for the MTV Video Music Award for Best Direction. The latter garnered controversy upon release and was initially censored due to its elements of violence. In 2012, Leto made his directorial debut with the documentary film Artifact. After a six-year hiatus, he returned to film acting in the 2013 drama Dallas Buyers Club starring together with Matthew McConaughey, for which he received the Academy Award for Best Supporting Actor, Golden Globe Award for Best Supporting Actor – Motion Picture, Screen Actors Guild Award for Outstanding Performance by a Male Actor in a Supporting Role and a variety of film critics' circle awards. Leto then premiered the web series Into the Wild (2014) and the documentary film A Day in the Life of America (2019). He also played the Joker in the superhero film Suicide Squad (2016), which was unfavorably reviewed by critics, though Leto's performance was better received.

In 2021, he played suspected serial killer Albert Sparma in John Lee Hancock's film The Little Things, which earned Leto nominations for a Golden Globe Award and Screen Actors Guild Award—both for Best Supporting Actor. The same year, Leto portrays fashion designer and business magnate Paolo Gucci in Ridley Scott's biographical crime drama film House of Gucci, which earned Leto nomination for a Satellite Award and Critics' Choice Movie Award—both for Best Supporting Actor. He played the Marvel Comics character Morbius the Living Vampire in the live-action film Morbius released in 2022, part of the Sony's Spider-Man Universe.

Film

Television

Music video

See also
 List of awards and nominations received by Jared Leto

References

External links
 

Filmography
Director filmographies
Male actor filmographies
American filmographies